Marcos António de Sousa Pimenta Machado (born July 8, 1957) is a former Brazilian goalkeeper.

Club career
Marcos Machado started his professional playing career at Sport Recife in Brazil starting in 1971. He became the youngest player to play in the National Championship in the first division during the 1973 season. Machado joined America Recife Club of Brazil in 1975 and played one season for them before joining Associação Atlética Santo Amaro in 1977. He played with Santo Amaro from 1977 to 1982, becoming one of the staple goalkeepers in Brazil. Other clubs Machado played from include Esportivo Bento Gonçalves in 1985, Central Sports Clube in 1987, and the União Futebol Clube from 1988 to 1990. During the 1988–89 season with União, the club won the Portugal Second Division Championship with Machado as the keeper. Machado continued to play with different squads until 2000, where he ended his career with the Central Florida Kraze of the USSL.

Coaching career
Machado has been the keeper coach for the Olympic Development Program (ODP) in Florida since 1998, Pine Castle Christian Academy Head Coach from 1998 to 2000, along with coaching various clubs in Central Florida area from 1997 on. In those 15 years of coaching, he spent six years as Technical Director with two different squads. From 2005 to 2007, he was the Technical Director for the IUS Elite Boys Program. In 2008, Machado became the Technical Director of the Florida Rush Soccer Boys program.

References

External links
 Profile at footballzz.com
 Profile at ForaDeJogo.net

Living people
1957 births
Brazilian footballers
Orlando City SC non-playing staff
Brazilian expatriate footballers
Brazilian expatriate sportspeople in Portugal
Brazilian expatriate sportspeople in the United States
Sport Club do Recife players
América Futebol Clube (PE) players
Clube Náutico Capibaribe players
Rio Ave F.C. players
C.F. União players
C.D. Nacional players
Orlando Sundogs players
Orlando City U-23 players
Association football goalkeepers
Sportspeople from Recife